Paradoxosia is a genus of moths in the subfamily Arctiinae. It contains the single species Paradoxosia rufipex, which is found in Uganda.

References

Natural History Museum Lepidoptera generic names catalog

Endemic fauna of Uganda
Lithosiini